Parabacteroides chinchillae is a Gram-negative, anaerobic and rod-shaped bacterium from the genus of Parabacteroides which has been isolated from the faeces of the chinchilla (Chinchilla lanigera) in Japan.

References 

Bacteroidia
Bacteria described in 2013